St. Henry is a village in Mercer County, Ohio, United States. The population was 2,596 at the 2020 census.

History
St. Henry was laid out in 1837 by Johann Heinrich Römer (1805-1874). It laid in a tract of land sold to him by his brother Franz on July 7, 1837. The tract was surveyed on July 7, the town was platted on July 13, and the plat was recorded on July 15, the feast of St. Henry. At the center of the village is St. Henry's Catholic Church.  Completed in 1897, the church is listed on the National Register of Historic Places. A post office has been in operation at St. Henry since 1850. The village was incorporated in 1901.

Geography
St. Henry is located at  (40.418715, -84.636054). The Wabash River also starts near the city.

Demographics

According to the Census Bureau, as of 2015 the median income for a household in the village was $80,000, and the median income for a family was $90,870. Males had a median income of $40,911 versus $27,102 for females. The per capita income for the village was $28,932. About 0.9% of families and 2.8% of the population were below the poverty line, including 2.0% of those under age 18 and 7.6% of those age 65 or over.

2010 census
As of the census of 2010, there were 2,427 people, 862 households, and 646 families residing in the village. The racial makeup of the village was 99.1% White, 0.1% African American, 0.6% from other races, and 0.2% from two or more races. Hispanic or Latino of any race were 1.4% of the population.

There were 862 households, of which 36.5% had children under the age of 18 living with them, 67.3% were married couples living together, 5.2% had a female householder with no husband present, 2.4% had a male householder with no wife present, and 25.1% were non-families. 22.4% of all households were made up of individuals, and 12.6% had someone living alone who was 65 years of age or older. The average household size was 2.79 and the average family size was 3.33.

The median age in the village was 35.2 years. 29.5% of residents were under the age of 18; 8.3% were between the ages of 18 and 24; 22.6% were from 25 to 44; 23.8% were from 45 to 64; and 15.7% were 65 years of age or older. The gender makeup of the village was 50.0% male and 50.0% female.

Education
St. Henry contains one public high school, St. Henry High School. The St. Henry Redskins Football team has won state titles in 1990, 1992, 1994, 1995, 2004, and 2006 with two 2nd-place finishes in 1996 and 1999. St. Henry Football is tied with Versailles and their chief rival Coldwater for the second-most state championships (6) in Ohio (5 behind fellow MAC school Marion Local (Maria Stein) at 11) for a public school since the introduction of the current playoff system in 1972. St. Henry High School is part of the Midwest Athletic Conference.

St. Henry High School also holds seven girls volleyball state championships (2011, 2004, 1995, 1994, 1990, 1987, 1985), four boys basketball state championships (1979, 1990, 1991, 2004), and three baseball state championships (1999, 2000, 2003).

St. Henry has a public library, a branch of the Mercer County District Library.

Notable people

 Jim Lachey, offensive tackle in the National Football League
 Jeff Hartings, center in the National Football League
 Bobby Hoying, quarterback in the National Football League
 Todd Boeckman, quarterback in the National Football League
 Wally Post, right fielder in Major League Baseball.

See also
Cranberry Prairie
Carthagena
Burkettsville
Coldwater

References

Further reading
 Alig, Joyce. A History of St. Henry, Ohio.  Otto Zimmerman, 1972.

External links
 

Villages in Mercer County, Ohio
Villages in Ohio